Gazpromavia (Gazpromavia Aviation) is an airline based in Moscow, Russia. It operates passenger and cargo charters, mainly in support of the oil and gas industry. It also operates regular domestic flights from Moscow and international charter passenger and cargo services.

History
The airline was established in March 1995 and started operations on 16 April 1995. It is wholly owned by JSC Gazprom Russia and has 2,736 employees (at March 2007).

Airports
Gazpromavia owns and operates the following two Class B airports which accommodate aircraft such as the Tu-154, Il-76, An-74 and all types of helicopters.:

Gazpromavia base Ostafyevo International Airport, located near Moscow
Yamburg airport located in Yamburg, Yamalo-Nenets Autonomous Okrug.

Destinations

Gazpromavia offers scheduled flights to the following destinations (as of December 2012):

Cagliari - Cagliari-Elmas Airport Seasonal
Pisa - Galileo Galilei Airport Seasonal

Barnaul - German Titov Barnaul International Airport
Belgorod - Belgorod International Airport
Beloyarsk - Beloyarsk Airport
Makhachkala - Uytash Airport
Moscow - Vnukovo Airport hub
Nadym - Nadym Airport
Novy Urengoy - Novy Urengoy Airport
Saint Petersburg - Pulkovo Airport
Samara - Kurumoch International Airport
Sochi - Sochi International Airport
Sovetsky - Sovetsky Airport
Tyumen - Roschino International Airport
Ulyanovsk - Ulyanovsk Baratayevka Airport
Yekaterinburg - Uktus Airport

 Belgrade - Belgrade Nikola Tesla Airport

Nukus - Nukus Airport

Codeshare agreements
UTair Aviation

Aerial services
Gazpromavia also provides the following services:
Aerial prospecting, monitoring and patrolling of works in regions that are difficult to access
Aerial delivery of the working shifts
Aerial logistical support of construction material, equipment, products, and medical supplies
Aerial construction and installation work, Air rescue and Air Ambulance services.

Fleet

As of January 2018, Gazpromavia fleet consists on the following aircraft:

Helicopter fleet
As of January 2018, Gazpromavia operates the following fleet of helicopters:

See also
SonAir

References

External links

Gazpromavia (English)
Gazpromavia (Russian)
Gazpromavia Fleet

Airlines of Russia
Gazprom subsidiaries
Companies based in Moscow
Airlines established in 1995
1995 establishments in Russia